Sinyang County is a kun (county) in South P'yŏngan, North Korea.

Administrative divisions
Sinyang County is divided into 1 ŭp (town), 1 rodongjagu (workers' district) and 16 ri (villages):

Transportation
Sinyang County is served by the P'yŏngra Line of the Korean State Railway.

References

External links
  Map of Pyongan provinces
  Detailed map

Counties of South Pyongan